Loreto College Rose Hill is a private secondary girls' school in Rose Hill, Mauritius. One of seven Loreto College campuses in Mauritius, it opened in 1951. Cathy de Cazanove is the current rector and the asst. rector is Roselyn Thomas.

History
It's on September 8, 1845, that a small community of Loreto Sisters arrived in Mauritius. Sister Augustin Hearne led a group of eight sisters from England. They installed in Port-Louis. They opened a non-paying secondary school there. Moreover, in the following years they opened three more secondary schools in Curepipe, Quatre-Bornes and St-Pierre. In 1951, a fifth secondary school in Rose-Hill was opened.

Curriculum
Loreto College Rose Hill is the only non-paying secondary school which offers German language as a subject which is compulsory from Grade 7 to Grade 9. Moreover, some students also choose German language for their A-level. Loreto College Rose Hill also offers Hindi language as a subject.

The school is equipped with a biology, chemistry, physics and Junior Lab. Also, three art rooms  and a Design lab.

Sports and traditions
LCRH has a gymnasium in which the regional competitions are held every year, most of the time for the volleyball competition.

The school's students participate in a variety of sports including basketball, football, handball, netball, and volleyball. They are particularly known for volleyball and hold an annual volleyball tournament.

In a show of solidarity with the poor, the school holds an annual charity meal when students bring in food and share with the poor and each other. Every last Saturday of the month, the school's charity club gives food to those in need, bought from money the girls voluntarily give on a weekly basis.

Notable alumnae
Ameeksha Dilchand, former Miss Mauritius

See also
 List of secondary schools in Mauritius 
 Education in Mauritius

References

External links
School Website

Educational institutions established in 1951
Girls' schools in Mauritius
Rose-Hill
Secondary schools in Mauritius
Beau Bassin-Rose Hill
1951 establishments in Mauritius